Richland Creek is a  long 3rd order tributary to the Deep River in Guilford County, North Carolina.  This stream is one of two streams named Richland Creek on the right bank of the Deep River.  The other Richland Creek is in Randolph County.

Course
Richland Creek rises in High Point, North Carolina in Guilford County and then flows east to join the Deep River about 3 miles southeast of High Point.

Watershed
Richland Creek drains  of area, receives about 46.1 in/year of precipitation, and has a wetness index of 415.28 and is about 19% forested.

References

Rivers of North Carolina
Rivers of Guilford County, North Carolina